South Central High School may refer to:
 South Central High School, South Central School District 401, Farina, Illinois
 South Central USD 300, Coldwater, Kansas
 South Central High School (North Carolina), Winterville, North Carolina
 South Central High School (Ohio), Greenwich, Ohio
 South Central Alternative School, Bismarck, North Dakota
 South Central Career Center, West Plains, Missouri
 South Central Junior & Senior High School, Elizabeth, Indiana
 South Central Junior-Senior High School, Union Mills, Indiana